The list of English translations from medieval sources: E–Z provides an overview of notable medieval documents—historical, scientific, ecclesiastical and literature—that have been translated into English. This includes the original author, translator(s) and the translated document. Translations are from Old and Middle English, Old French, Old Norse, Latin, Arabic, Greek, Persian, Syriac, Ethiopic, Coptic, Armenian, and Hebrew, and most works cited are generally available in the University of Michigan's HathiTrust digital library and OCLC's WorldCat. Anonymous works are presented by topic.

List of English translations

E
El Cid. See Cid Campeador, El.

Elizabeth I. Elizabeth I (1533–1603) was Queen of England and Ireland from 1558 until her death.

 Queen Elizabeth's Englishings of Boethius, Plutarch and Horace (1899). De consolatione philosophiae, A.D. 1593;  Plutarch, De curiositate [1598]; Horace, De arte poetica (part) A.D. 1598. Edited from the unique manuscript, partly in the Queen's hand, in the Public Record Office, London, by Miss Caroline Pemberton. In Early English Text Society, Original Series, 113.
 The girlhood of Queen Elizabeth, a narrative in contemporary letters (1909).  by Frank Arthur Mumby (1872–1954). With an introduction by Sir Robert Sangster Rait (1874–1936).
 The mirror of the sinful soul (1897).  A prose translation of The Miroir or Glasse of the Synneful Soul from the French, made in 1544 by the Princess (afterwards Queen) Elizabeth, then eleven years of age. Reprodued in facsimile, with portrait, for the Royal Society of Literature of the United Kingdom, and edited, with an introduction and notes, by Percy W. Ames (1853–1919).
 Queene Elizabethes achademy (by Sir Humphrey Gilbert) (1879). Edited by English philologist Frederick James Furnivall (1825–1910). A booke of percedence. The ordering of a funerall, &c. Varying versions of The good wife, The wise man, &c. Maxims, Lydgate's Order of fools, A poem on heraldly, Occleve on Lord's men, &c. With essays on early Italian and German books of courtesy, by William Michael Rossetti (1829–1919) and Eugen Oswald (1826–1912). In Early English Text Society, Extra Series, 8.

Egyptian tales, Coptic. See Coptic texts.

Egyptian tales, Muslim. Medieval tales from Egypt after the advent of Islam. See also Arabic literature.

 Sacred books and early literature of the East, Volume II (1917). With historical surveys of the chief writings of each nation. Under the editorship of a staff of specialists directed by Prof. Charles Francis Horne (1870–1942).
 Egyptian tales and romances: pagan, Christian and Muslim (1931). Translated by British Egyptologist and orientalist Sir Ernest Alfred Wallis Budge (1857–1934). Includes: (1) The story of Muhammad the Clever One; (2) The story of the Bear-of-the-Kitchen; (3) The story of Fulla, the Shaykha of the Arabs; (4) The story of the fisherman and his son; (5) The story of the Princess Datal; (6) The story of the virtous maiden and the wicked Kādī and Wazīr; (7) The story of the prince who learned the trade of the silk-weaver; (8) The story of the amorous prince; (9) The story of the itinerant musician and his son; (10) The story of the maiden and the singing nightingale; (11) The story of the Princess Arab-Zandīq; and, (12) The story of the prince and his horse.
 The book of the thousand nights and one night (1882–1884). Now first completely done into English prose and verse, from the original Arabic. Translated by English poet John Payne (1842–1916). The Arabic original descends from an unknown text, now lost, which is represented by Galland's manuscript and the modern Egyptian recession.

Egyptian tales, pagan. Pagan tales of Egypt, translated into English.

 Egyptian tales and romances: pagan, Christian and Muslim (1931). Translated by British Egyptologist and orientalist Sir Ernest Alfred Wallis Budge (1857–1934). Includes. (1) Stories of the marvelous deeds wrought by the magicians of the Old Kingdom; (2) The appeals of the wronged peasant Khunanpu (the Eloquent Peasant); (3) The story of Prince Sanehe; (4) The shipwrecked sailor and his adventures; (5) The tale of the two brothers; (6) How the witch-goddess Isis usurped the power of Rā the Sun God; (7) The price who was predestined to die a violent death; (8) Un-Amen’s mission to the Lebanon; (9) How the god Khonsu expelled a devil from the Princess of Bekhten; (10) Setma Khāmuas and his converse with the dead; (11) The story of Khāmuas and his son Sa-Asar (Tale of Setne Khamwas and Si-Osire); and (12) Setom Khāmuas as the saviour of Egypt.

England, histories of. Select translations of works related to the history of England. See also Chronicles of England and London.

 Church historians of England. Translated from the Latin by English archivist Joseph Stevenson (1806–1895) Includes: The Historical Works of the Venerable Beda; The Anglo-Saxon Chronicle, The Chronicle of Florence of Worcester; The Chronicle of Fabius Ethelweerd, Asser's Annals of King Alfred, The Book of Hyde, The Chronicles of John Wallingford, The History of Ingulf, Gaimar; The History of the Kings of England, and of His own Times, by William of Malmesbury; The Historical Works of Simeon of Durham; The Chronicles of John and Richard of Hexham, The Chronicle of Holyrood, The Cronicle of Melrose, Jordan Fantosme's Chronicle, Documents Respecting Canterbury and Winchester; The History of William of Newburgh, The Chronicles of Robert De Monte; History of King Henry The First; The Acts of Stephen, King of England, and Duke of Normandy; Giraldus Cambrensis Concerning The Introduction of Princes; Richard of Devizes; The History of the Archbishops of Canterbury, by Gervase, Monk of Canterbury; Robert of Gloucester's Chronicle; The Chronicle of the Isle of Man; The Life and Defence of John Foxe; The Acts and Monuments of John Foxe; The Acts and Monuments of John Foxe.
 The chronicle of Richard of Devizes, including Richard of Cirencester's Description of Britain (1841). Translated and edited by English historian John Allen Giles (1808–1884).
 Antiquitates Celto-Normannicae (1786). Containing the Chronicle of Man and the isles, abridged by Camden, and now first published, complete, from the original ms. in the British Musaeum: with an English translation, and notes: to which are added extracts from the Annals of Ulster, and Sir J. Ware's Antiquities of Ireland, British topography by Ptolemy, Richard of Cirencester, the geographer of Ravenna, and Andrew bishop of Cathness : together with accurate catalogues of the Pictish and Scottish kings /  by the Rev. James Johnstone (died 1798).
 The Historical collections of a citizen of London in the fifteenth century (1876). Edited by British historian James Gairdner (1828–1912). Includes the Chronicle of London by Sir William Gregory (c. 1400–1467). With an Appendix: Mayors and Sheriffs.
 The political songs of England,  from the reign of John to that of Edward II (1884).  Ed. and tr. by Thomas Wright ... and revised by Edmund Goldsmid

English literature. Translations of Old and Middle English works of fiction and poetry.

 Select translations from Old English prose,  edited by Albert S. Cook and Chauncey B. Tinker.

Epic tales

 Epic and saga (1910). Includes: (1) Beowulf, translated by Frances Barton Gummere (1855–1919); The songs of Roland, translated by John O'Hagan The destruction of Dá Derga's hostel, translated by Whitley Stokes (1830–1909); The story of the Volsungs and Niblungs, translated by Eiríkr Magnússon (1833–1913) and William Morris (1834–1896); Songs from The Elder Edda, translated by Eiríkr Magnússon and William Morris. With introductions and notes. Harvard classics 49.
 The ancient Irish epic tale Táin bó Cúalnge: The Cualnge cattle-raid (1914). A translation of Táin bó Cúailnge, considered Ireland's national epic. Now for the first time done entire into English out of the Irish of the Book of Leinster and allied manuscripts by Joseph Dunn (1872–1951), with two pages in facsimilé of the manuscripts. The story was paraphrased by Mary A. Drummond Hutton in The Táin (1924).

Exeter Book. Exeter Book

 The Exeter book (1895). An anthology of Anglo-Saxon poetry presented to Exeter Cathedral by Loefric, first bishop of Exeter (1050-1071), and still in possession of the dean and chapter. Edited from the manuscript, with a translation, notes, introduction, etc., by English historian and Shakespearian scholar Sir Israel Gollancz (1863–1930). In Early English Text Society, Original series, Volume 104, 194.

F
Froissart, Jean. Jean Froissart (c. 1337 – c. 1405) was an author and court historian from the Low Countries. His Chronicles, recognized as an expression of the chivalric revival of the 14th century.

 Chronicles of England, France, and the Adjoining Countries, 5 volumes (c. 1400). Known as Froissart's Chronicles, the work covers from the latter part of the reign of Edward II to the coronation of Henry IV. Derived from the French editions, with variations and additions from many celebrated manuscripts, edited by French historian Jean-Baptiste de La Curne de Sainte-Palaye (1697–1781. Translated by English writer and printer Thomas Johnes (1748–1816).

G

Geography. Medieval works on geography and cartography include the following.

 Compendium of Ancient Geography, 2 volumes (1742). By French geographer and cartographer Jean Baptiste Bourguignon d'Anville (1697–1782). Translated with an interesting discussion on translation. Translated from the French by British antiquarian John Horsley (c. 1685 – 1732) Illustrated with maps, carefully reduced from those of the Paris atlas, in imperial folio; with a map of Roman Britain, and with prolegomena and notes by the translator.
 Contributions to the history of geography (1891–1892), by American Semitic scholar Richard James Horatio Gottheil (1862–1936). In the American journal of Semitic languages and literatures, Volume VII,pp. 39–55, Volume VIII, pp. 65–78.
 A volume in the autograph of Yāqūt the geographer (1951). By Arthur John Arberry (1905–1969), a British orientalist. A brief description of the work of Arab scholar Yaqut al-Hamawi (1179–1229), with a reproduction of the manuscript of the Tamām Fasīh al-kalām of Ahmad ibn Fāris.
 Ptolemy's geography (1908) A brief account of all the printed editions of Ptolemy's Geography down to 1730, with notes on some important variations observed in that of Ulm 1482, including the recent discovery of the earliest printed map of the world yet known on modern geographical conceptions in which some attempt was made to depart from ancient traditions. By Henry Newton Stevens (1855–1930). Now preserved in the library of Edward Everett Ayer (1841–1927).
Gesta Romanorum. Gesta Romanorum (c. early 14th century) is a Latin collection of anecdotes and tales ambiguously translated as Deeds of the Romans. It was one of the most popular books of the time used as source material for Geoffrey Chaucer, William Shakespeare, and others.

 The early English versions of the Gesta Romanorum (1879). First edited by Sir Frederic Madden for the Roxburghe Club, and now re-edited from the manuscripts in the British Museum (Harl. 7333 & Addit. 9066) and University Library, Cambridge (Kk. 1. 6), with introduction, notes, and glossary by Sidney John Hervon Herrtage. In Early English Text Society, Extra Series, 33.

Gilbert, Humphrey. Sir Humphrey Gilbert (c. 1539 – 1583) was an adventurer, explorer, member of parliament and soldier who served during the reign of Elizabeth I of England. He was a pioneer of the English colonial empire in North America and Ireland. He was a maternal half-brother of Sir Walter Raleigh.

 Queene Elizabethes achademy (1869). Edited by English philologist Frederick James Furnivall (1825–1910). In Early English Text Society, Extra Series, 8.

Giovanni de' Marignolli. Giovanni de' Marignolli, known as John of Marignolli (fl. 1338–53), was a notable 14th-century Catholic European traveller to medieval China and India.

 John de Marignolli's recollections of Eastern travel (1338–1353). In Cathay and the way thither: being a collection of medieval notices of China (1913–1916), Volume II, Chapter V. New edition of a translation by Sir Henry Yule (1820–1889), revised by French orientalist Henri Cordier (1849–1925). Printed for the Hakluyt society, Second series, Volumes 33, 37, 38, 41.
 The Minor Friars in China (1917). By British sinologist Arthur Christopher Moule (1873–1957). Extracts from the chronicle of Giovanni de' Marignolli written c. 1354 and letters from the khan to pope Benedict XII, with the pope's replies. In Journal of the Royal Asiatic Society, (1917), pp. 1–36.

Godfrey of Bouillon. Godfrey of Bouillon (1060–1100) was a French nobleman and one of the leaders of the First Crusade. He was the first ruler of the Kingdom of Jerusalem, serving from 1099 to 1100, and using the title Advocatus sancti sepulchri as opposed to king.

Godeffroy of Boloyne: The siege and conqueste of Jerusalem (1893). By William, archbishop of Tyre (c. 1130 – 1186). Translated from the French by English printer and writer William Caxton (c. 1422 – c. 1491), and printed by him in 1481. Edited from the copy in the British museum, with introduction, notes, vocabulary, and indexes, by Mary Noyes Colvin. Taken from a French translation of William's Historia rerum in partibus transmarinis gestarum (History of Deeds Done Beyond the Sea). In Early English Text Society, Extra series, Volume 64.
Godfrey of Bulloigne; or, The recovery of Jerusalem (1818). Done into English heroical verse, from the Italian, by English translator Edward Fairfax (c. 1580 –1635). The first complete English translation of La Gerusalemme liberata, by Italian poet Torquato Tasso (1544–1595). The work is a reinvention of the First Crusade, with Godfrey of Bouillon lionized as the ideal military leader, using both the 1464 work of Benedetto Accolti, De Bello a Christianis contra Barbaros, and other available original sources.
The history of Helyas, Knight of the Swan (1901). Translated by Robert Copland (fl. 1508–1547). The story of the Knight of the Swan (Chevalier au Cygne) is a medieval tale reworked in the Crusader cycle to have the hero a legendary ancestor of Godfrey of Bouillon.
Legends of Godfrey of Bouillon. In A manual of the writings in Middle English,1050–1400 (1923–1927), Chapter I.4, pp. 95–97. By John Edwin Wells (1875–1943).
Gower, John. John Gower (c. 1330 – 1408) was an English poet, contemporary of the Pearl Poet, and a personal friend of Geoffrey Chaucer. His major works, the Mirour de l'Omme, Vox Clamantis, and Confessio Amantis, are united by common moral and political themes.

 Tales of the seven deadly sins; being the Confessio amantis of John Gower (1889). Edited by English biographer Henry Morley (1822–1894).
 Confessio amantis (2006). Edited by Russell A. Peck and translated by Andrew Galloway. Middle English Texts Society, University of Rochester
 Mirour de l'omme =  The mirror of mankind (1992). Translated by William Burton Wilson; revised by Nancy Wilson Van Baak with a foreword by R.F. Yeager.
The Pearl Poet, Gower. In A manual of the writings in Middle English,1050–1400 (1923–1927), Chapter XV, pp. 578–598. By John Edwin Wells (1875–1943).
Griselda. Griselda is a figure in European folklore noted for her patience and obedience. She appears in Boccaccio's Decameron, Tenth day, Petrarch's Historia Griseldis, and Chaucer's The Clerk's Tale.

 Gualtherus and Griselda, or, The Clerk of Oxford's tale (1741). From Boccace [Boccaccio], Petrarch, and Chaucer. Including: (1) A letter to a friend, with the Clerk of Oxford's character; (2) The Clerk of Oxford's prologue, from Chaucer; (3) The Clerk of Oxford's conclusion, from Petrarch; (4) The declaration, or l'Envoy de Chaucer, a les Maris de notre Temps, from Chaucer; (5) The words of our host, from Chaucer; and, (6) A letter in Latin, from Petrarch to Boccaccio.  By English author and translator George Ogle (1704–1746).
 The story of patient Griselda, from the Clerk's tale of Geoffrey Chaucer (1906). Done into modern English with a few notes, by British philologist Rev. Walter William Skeat (1835–1912).
 The story of Griselda: being the tenth story of the tenth day from the Decameron of Messer Giovanni Boccaccio (1909). Translated by James Macmullen Rigg (1855–1926).
 The history of patient Grisel, 1619 (1885).  A translation of The Ancient True And Admirable History Of Patient Grisel by Charles Perrault (1628–1703). Edited, with an introduction, by British author Henry B. Wheatley (1838–1917).

L
Lambeth Palace Library Ms. 853. A collection of 15th century courtesies and hymn in the Lambeth Place Library. The works below are edited by English philologist Frederick James Furnivall (1825–1910) and a part of the publications of the Early English Text Society (EETS), Original or Extra Series. The contents of ms. 853 are in Hymns to the Virgin & Christ, pp. xiiix-xiv.

 Hymns to the Virgin & Christ, the Parliament of devils, and other religious poems: chiefly from the Archbishop of Canterbury's Lambeth ms. no. 853 (1867–1896). EETS, OS 24. Includes: Surge mea sponsa; poems to Christ; The Deuelis perlament; The world is false and vain; Earth; Reuertere; Merci passith Rightness; the Belief; Ten Commandments; the 16 points of charity; 
 Political, religious, and love poems (1866–1903). EETS, OS 15.
 The Babees book: Early English Meals and Manners (1838). EETS, OS 32.
 Queene Elizabethes achademy (by Sir Humphrey Gilbert) (1879). EETS, ES 8.
Lefèvre, Raoul. Raoul Lefèvre (fl. 1460) was the French author of the Recuyell of the historyes of Troye (1464), the first English printed book. Lefèvre served as the chaplain of Philip the Good (1396–1467), Duke of Burgundy and the creator of the chivalrous Order of the Golden Fleece.

 The recuyell of the historyes of Troye (1894). Written in French, and translated and printed by William Caxton, c. 1474. Reproduced with a critical introduction, index and glossary, and eight pages in photographic facsimile, by Heinrich Oskar Sommer (born 1861).
 The History of Jason (1913). Translated from the French by William Caxton. Edited by John James Munro. In Early English Text Society, Extra Series, 111.
Stair Ercuil focus a bas, the life and death of Hercules (1939). Translated and edited by Ernest Gordon Quin. Adapted from the last part of Volume I and all of Volume II of  The recuyell of the historyes of Troye. Published by the Irish Texts Society, Volume 38.

Source material

 A general history and collection of voyages and travels to the end of the eighteenth century
 Crusader Texts in Translation
Early English Text Society
 Hakluyt Society publications
Irish Texts Society
Modern philology

See also

 Annals
 Arabic literature
 Islamic literature
 Medieval literature

Footnotes

References

 
11
Translations into English
Translation-related lists